Courtney Hicks (born December 15, 1995) is an American figure skater. She has won two medals on the Grand Prix series—silver at the 2015 NHK Trophy and bronze at the 2016 Rostelecom Cup—and two medals on the ISU Challenger Series. She took gold at two other senior internationals, the 2013 Ice Challenge and U.S. Classic.

Personal life 
Courtney Hicks was born on December 15, 1995 in Placentia, California. The eldest of three girls, she is of Russian descent through her mother who has three Russian grandparents.

Career 
Hicks began skating in 2001. She placed 5th in the novice event at the 2010 U.S. Championships.

2010–11 to 2012–13
Hicks won the junior title at the 2011 U.S. Championships. She was selected to compete at the 2011 World Junior Championships, where she placed sixth in her international debut.

In the 2011–12 season, Hicks debuted on the Junior Grand Prix series, winning a gold medal at her first event in Brisbane, Australia. She sustained a season-ending injury while competing at her second JGP event, on October 8, 2011 in Milan, Italy. On the opening jump in the long program, a piece of bone detached from the tibia in her right leg. She underwent surgery on October 12. Hicks returned to the ice in December 2011 and resumed jumping in February 2012. She was coached mainly by John Nicks in Aliso Viejo, California until April 2012 when her primary coach became Ken Congemi at the Toyota Sports Center in El Segundo, California.

Coached by Jere Michael and Alex Chang, Hicks won the pewter medal at the 2013 U.S. Championships and placed 5th at the 2013 World Junior Championships.

2013–14 season to present 
Hicks made her senior international debut in the 2013–14 season, winning gold at  the 2013 U.S. International Figure Skating Classic ahead of Gracie Gold. Replacing 2010 Olympic champion Kim Yuna, she placed 6th at her first senior Grand Prix (GP) event, the 2013 Skate Canada International. Hicks won the 2013 Ice Challenge ahead of Miki Ando. After finishing 6th at the 2014 U.S. Championships, she was sent to the 2014 Four Continents, where she placed 5th.

In 2014–15, Hicks won silver at the U.S. Classic, a part of the newly inaugurated ISU Challenger Series (CS). She finished fourth at both of her GP assignments, the 2014 Skate Canada International and 2014 Trophee Eric Bompard, and 8th at the 2015 U.S. Championships.

In 2015–16, Hicks started her season with a bronze medal at the CS Nebelhorn Trophy. Competing on the GP series, she placed 6th at the 2015 Cup of China before winning her first GP medal, silver, at the 2015 NHK Trophy. She finished 9th at the 2016 U.S. Championships. Having decided to change coaches in March 2016, she spent several months working with the 87-year-old John Nicks, from whom she had previously taken lessons, before joining Todd Sand in early August.

In 2018–19, Hicks added a triple flip-triple loop combination to her short program and free skate. She finished 7th at the 2018 U.S. International Figure Skating Classic and finished 8th at the 2018 NHK Trophy.  At the 2019 U.S. Championships, Hicks placed sixteenth. She was eighth the following season.

Hicks placed sixteenth at the 2020 ISP Points Challenge, a virtual competition. She did not compete at the Championship Series, another virtual competition used the qualifier for Nationals. In January 2021, she announced she had been struggling with a hip injury and had surgery to replace it. She said would be off the ice for a couple of months.

Programs

Competitive highlights
GP: Grand Prix; CS: Challenger Series; JGP: Junior Grand Prix

References

External links
 
 Courtney Hicks at IceNetwork.com
 Official site

1995 births
American female single skaters
American people of Russian descent
People from Placentia, California
Living people
21st-century American women